Epipsocidae is an insect family of Psocodea (formerly Psocoptera) belonging to the suborder Psocomorpha, that includes, among others, the genera Bertkauia, Epipsocus, Epipsocopsis, Goja, and the New Guinean endemic Dicropsocus. It includes 16 genera with more than 140 species. The only European species in the family is the (almost always) apterous Bertkauia lucifuga. Like the other members of the infraorder Epipsocetae, they have a labrum with two sclerotized ridges. Epipsocids are barklice found primarily in tropical regions, and one of their distinguishing characteristics is the hairy ventral surface of the forewing.

Sources
Lienhard, C. & Smithers, C. N. 2002. Psocoptera (Insecta): World Catalogue and Bibliography. Instrumenta Biodiversitatis, vol. 5. Muséum d'histoire naturelle, Genève.

References

 
Psocoptera families